The 2018–19 Swiss Super League (referred to as the Raiffeisen Super League for sponsoring reasons) was the 122nd season of top-tier competitive football in Switzerland and the 16th under its current name and format.

A total of 10 teams competed in the league: the 9 best teams from the 2017–18 season and the 2017–18 Swiss Challenge League champion Xamax. The season started on the weekend of 21–22 July 2018 and concluded on 25 May 2019 with a break between 17 December 2018 and 2 February 2019.

In May 2018, the Swiss Football League voted in favor of reintroducing the relegation play-offs, starting from the 2018–19 season. At the end of the season, the 9th-placed team of the Swiss Super League will face the 2nd-placed team of the Swiss Challenge League in a two-legged play-off to determine which of the two will compete in the Super League the following season.

Teams

Stadia and locations

Personnel and kits

Managerial changes

League table

Results

First and second round

Third and fourth round

Relegation play-offs
Ninth placed Xamax faced Aarau, the runner-up of 2018–19 Swiss Challenge League.

First leg

Second leg

Neuchâtel Xamax won on penalties after drawing 4–4 on aggregate and will stay in the Swiss Super League.

Attendances

Season Statistics

Top scorers

Top assists

Hat-tricks

Awards

Annual awards

References

External links
Official website

Swit
Swiss Super League seasons
2018–19 in Swiss football